"Ubavoj nam Crnoj Gori" was the national and state anthem of the Kingdom of Montenegro in the late 19th-early 20th century. A popular song called "Onamo, 'namo!" also existed. The educational system had an honorific song, the Hymn to Saint Sava, which was sung in the Saint's honour.

The lyrics were made in 1865 by the Serb poet and a priest named Jovan Sundečić, who was the secretary of Prince Nikola I of Montenegro. The music was composed by Jovo Ivanišević, drawing from "Uskliknimo s ljubavlju", hymn to Saint Sava and later adapted by Anton Schulz. The anthem was first performed on October 17, 1870, after which Prince Nikola declared it as the state anthem. In 1993, it was one of the proposals during the unsuccessful negotiations to adopt a regional anthem of the then-Yugoslav province of Montenegro. The main problem was its monarchist lyrics, which were unfitting for Montenegro as at the time it was a republican state.

Lyrics

Notes 
  Glas Crnogorca, October 19, 1999: Jovan Markuš: Двије црногорске химне
  Ослобођење, независност и уједињење Србије и Црне Горе, Химне Србије и Црне Горе
  Medijaklub:

References

External links
 Ubavoj nam Crnoj Gori on nationalanthems.info
  Ubavoj nam Crnoj Gori with music and lyrics
  0:38—The melody of Ubavoj nam Crnoj Gori

Anthems of Montenegro
Historical national anthems
Serbian patriotic songs
Kingdom of Montenegro
Royal anthems